Olympic Medical Center is a medical organization located in Port Angeles and Sequim, Washington which provides services to patients in Clallam and Jefferson counties.  The principal operating location is Olympic Memorial Hospital  in Port Angeles.  This location consists of 126 in-patient hospital beds and many other hospital services and has one of two Level III trauma centers in the state.

Olympic Medical Center was established on November 1, 1951, with the founding of the hospital.  The organization has grown into the largest employer on the Olympic Peninsula with over 1500 employees.

References

See also
 List of hospitals in Washington (state)

External links
 Olympic Medical Center main website

Hospital buildings completed in 1951
Hospitals in Washington (state)
Buildings and structures in Clallam County, Washington
Buildings and structures in Jefferson County, Washington
Hospitals established in 1951
1951 establishments in Washington (state)